Parafossarulus manchouricus  is a species of freshwater snail with gills and an operculum, an aquatic prosobranch gastropod mollusk in the family Bithyniidae.

This species is medically important as a host for the liver fluke Clonorchis sinensis in East Asia.

Subspecies 
 Parafossarulus  manchouricus japonicus (Pilsbry, 1901)

Description
The shell has 5.5 whorls. The width of the shell is 6 mm. The height of the shell is 10 mm.

The haploid chromosome number of Parafossarulus manchouricus is n=17.

Distribution 
This species occurs in: Russia (Amur River basin), Japan (Honshū, Kyushu and Shikoku), Korea, Taiwan and China.

The type locality is the Amur River and other rivers in the southern Siberia ("le fleuve Amour et divers cours d'eau de la Sibérie méridionale").

Habitat 
Parafossarulus  manchouricus lives in shallow ponds and in irrigation channels.

Parasites 
This species is a first intermediate host for Clonorchis sinensis.

References

Further reading 
 Kim C. H. "Study on some differences between Bithynia misella and Parafossarulus manchouricus". Korean Journal of Parasitology.

Bithyniidae
Gastropods described in 1860